Righeira were an Italian Italo disco duo, formed in Turin in 1983, that comprised Johnson Righeira (lead vocals and keyboards) and Michael Righeira (backing vocals, keyboards and harmonica). Originally rooted in the early stages of Italo disco music, Righeira's musical style evolved throughout their career, incorporating elements of synth-pop and new wave in their songs in innovative ways, later exploring music styles such as electronic music and regular pop. 

The duo was formed after attending the Albert Einstein Scientific High School as schoolmates. Within the first months of their career, they signed with several record labels and released their debut album, Righeira (1983). With the release of the album, and the singles "Vamos a la playa" and "No Tengo Dinero", Righeira established their reputation as a modern dance duo. They scored another hit in the mid-1980s with the single "L'estate sta finendo", and won the Festivalbar singing competition in 1985. The duo's second album, Bambini Forever (1986), earned less success in public when it was released but included songs as "Italians a Go-Go", "Oasi in città" and "Innamoratissimo", with which they performed at the Sanremo Music Festival in 1986.

Righeira worked  throughout the 1980s. Soon after the release of their third studio album, Uno, Zero, Centomila (1992), they broke up, and worked separately for seven years. Both singers produced music and pursued a new musical direction by which they were influenced by Eurodance, rock, reggae, and Italo house. In 1999, they were reunited and made a successful comeback by then recording and releasing music, embracing a more ironic and electronic image. The duo released re-recorded versions of some of their hit songs, including "Vamos a la playa" in 2001. Experimenting with their new image, they released their fourth album, Mondovisione (2007), gaining mixed success. After performing together for over 25 years, the duo broke up for the second time in 2016.

Righeira have released four studio albums along with several singles throughout their career, selling millions of records worldwide. The duo remain as one of the most progressive ones in the Italo disco genre, along with their producers La Bionda.

History

1980–1983: Formation

Beginnings and name changes 
Stefano Righi and Stefano Rota met at the Albert Einstein Scientific High School in Barriera di Milano in Turin. They began making music together in the late 1970s, and changed their name to Righeira. The name was made up by Righi, who jokingly made a Brazilian-Portuguese pronunciation of his surname, when playing football in school. Righi recalled: "Maybe I liked the idea of being a native ... all of this became a character in the end." The two singers, billing themselves as Johnson and Michael Righeira, began calling themselves "musical brothers" in 1981. According to Igor Nogarotto, it was because they had grown tired of their "banal friendship".

Johnson Righeira's solo career 
In 1980, twenty-year-old Righi released his debut single "Bianca Surf". The recording session took place at Italian Records Studios in Bologna. While sung by Righi himself, the song was played by the local punk band Skiantos, with Leonardo Grezzi on drums, Andrea Dalla Valle and Gianni Bolelli on guitars and Franco Villani on bass guitar.

Some of the earliest versions of "Vamos a la playa" tracks back to 1981, when Righi and some acquaintances paid visit to a mutual friend's music studio in Florence during New Year's Eve. According to Righi, he came up with the signature phrase "Vamos a la playa, oh-o-o-o-oh" while he was playing on a keyboard in the studio. The melodies in the song were later recorded via an old analog synth. The song was inspired by the 1960s and was intended to come out as a post-atomic beach song with electric elements. The major project began in early 1981 and was completed before Righi and Rota left for military service, only to be edited and released later in the spring. With the song gaining its popularity in public, both were allowed by the command to leave the barracks in order to appear on television performances under several occasions. That same year, when Rota auditioned, he sang both "Vamos a la playa" and an Italian version of the West German electropunk band Deutsch Amerikanische Freundschaft's song "Der Mussolini", called "Balla Marinetti", while he was partially known under the pseudonym of "Italo Monitor". The Italian title "Balla Marinetti" is a reference to the author and founder of the Futurism movement, Filippo Tommaso Marinetti.

Signing with La Bionda 
Neither Righi nor Rota had any classical education when they decided to start their careers. Both singers were more interested in the sound and melodies of their songs than in actually making them. Their knowledge and interests in graphic design and the film industry helped them become aware of what a modern Italian musician would look like. When the recordings started in 1983, they still lacked the knowledge to produce and release music on their own. They received help from the successful Italian La Bionda brothers, Carmelo and Michelangelo, from Milan. They had met the brothers for the first time in 1982 and signed contracts that would be valid until 1987.

Righeira was introduced to the La Bionda brothers as singers, who wanted them to be hosts for a show they were planning because of their look and attitude. The duo denied since they were pressing to do some of their recordings. 
While Righeira was signed under the name of Carmelo and Michelangelo, they had the opportunity to experiment with their own sound. The duo's debut album, Righeira, released in 1983, featured a futuristic and modern sound with lyrics about nuclear annihilation. This differentiated the duo from their producers, who in the 1970s had achieved success, both in Italy and internationally, within the disco genre for their romantic songs.

1983–1985: Mainstream breakthrough

Righeira 

During the span of two months, between August and September 1983, Righeira recorded eight songs during several studio sessions for their debut LP, Righeira. La Bionda considered recording the LP in Munich, since they had moved their recording production to the city in the 1970s. Soon after the release of "Tanzen mit Righeira", the single "Vamos a la playa" was released in June 1983, four months ahead of the album. It reached number one in Italy and entered the UK Singles Chart, where it peaked at number 53.

Recalling how "on Righeira, gone were the themes of love, sex, or stuff of that nature, in (surprisingly) was Stefano Righi singing about nuclear annihilation, government surveillance, and crippling hypermodernism", author Diego Olivas wrote: "On tracks like "Jazz Musik", "Gli parlerò di te", and "Kon Tiki" you get the sense that all the crew involved really took umbrage to decadent Italy, there outré culture was selling, and they themselves didn’t feel privy to. From the album cover to the stilted music, which forced you to contort yourselves to a different kind of groove, everything on Righeira sounded "off" in the most unpretentious, yet surgically designed way they could."

The duo's third single, "No Tengo Dinero", came out during the autumn and became another international hit. Producer Carmelo La Bionda recalled: "There were producers in Spain who got the inspiration from these hits to start making similar music." The song was written in Spanish because it was considered an unusual combination with electronic pop music. "No Tengo Dinero" was later released in other countries, including the UK and the US, via the A&M label. Short promotional films were made for both songs; they aired on Top of the Pops in September. As their popularity spread, the duo was at first prevented from capitalizing on their successes as they were recalled into fulfilling their military service.

The promotional music video for "No Tengo Dinero" was an animated video, something that was considered an unusual technique to use to make music videos at the time. Because the duo could not record music videos on their own, storyboards were sent to a director to make animated videos. With this method, the duo was able to popularize their new postmodern-futuristic look and even market their music.

The song "Luciano Serra Pilota", which was included on the A-side of the Righeira album, was not released as a single but still achieved good success in Italy. When Righi wrote the song, he drew inspiration from the Italian war drama film Luciano Serra, Pilot, released in 1938 starring Amedeo Nazzari as Luciano Serra in the leading role. In the animated music video, Righi and Rota are seen dancing and singing, while they stand and sit on a biplane, dressed in pilot uniforms. The music video has been described by German Rolling Stone writer Eric Pfeil as a "parody of fascist heroes".

Festivalbar 
The song "L'estate sta finendo" was released in May 1985 and quickly reached the charts. The single ended up at number 1 in Italy and stayed there for two weeks. 
In recent years, the song has become popular in the football world as a reworked football chant and has been played in several clubs throughout the world, including Liverpool F.C. where it is known as "Allez Allez Allez". With the same song, Righeira participated in the Un disco per l'estate summer festival and also managed to win the Festivalbar singing competition the same year. The song, despite its title that the summer is ending, was released when the summer period was about to begin. After the Festivalbar victory, the song became even more popular and finally managed to become the most played song on jukebox during the summer of 1985 in Italy. "L'estate sta finendo" was co-written by Righi, Rota and Carmelo La Bionda, although Righi came up with the song himself, while "Crossing the bridge over the Dora aboard tram number 3".

In 1985, Rota starred in the Italian television variety show Drive In, which aired on the Italia 1 channel, where he performed a sketch together with actor and comedian Enrico Beruschi.

1986–1988: Further success

Sanremo Music Festival 
The duo made an appearance at the 36th anniversary of the Sanremo Music Festival in 1986 with the song "Innamoratissimo". The song was quickly noticed by critics, and made them finish in fifteenth place out of twenty-two participating contestants after the final voting. Apart from the duo's lack of knowledge in stage performances and their participation in the first live version of the Sanremo festival, they were praised and met with positive criticism from the critics after their performance. This song was also centered on electronic arrangements that continued the musical discourse undertaken by their producers and arrangers, La Bionda, who had already marked musical trends with disco music in the previous decade. Righi later described their performance at Sanremo as a "turning point" in their career.

Bambini Forever 
Righeira's second studio LP, Bambini Forever, was released on 23 June 1986 and became their last album to be produced by La Bionda. According to Carmelo La Bionda, they "wanted to record another album, but we decided to quit the adventure because we thought that the two singers had in mind to produce themselves". He recalled that it was a mistake "that they didn't continue to work with us. Righeira moved from Milan to a city not far from Venice and started recording with new programmers and tried to be their own producers."

Rimini Rimini and Zecchino d'Oro 
Righeira released the single "Rimini Splash Down" in 1987. It was co-written together with La Bionda and the singer Raffaella Riva from the Italian Italo disco band Gruppo Italiano. The song eventually became the theme song for the Rimini Rimini anthology comedy film, directed by Sergio Corbucci and released in the spring of the same year. Gruppo Italiano made several collaborations with Righeira during their career and also recorded their own version of the duo's hit from 1985, "L'estate sta finendo", on their cover album Surf in Italy.

Later the same year, they were invited to the 30th anniversary of the Zecchino d'Oro singing competition and made a performance with the song "Annibale".

1988–1992: Decline in popularity and first split 
On 4 September 1988, Righeira made a live performance at the Canada's Wonderland theme park in Vaughan, Canada. The performance included songs from the Righeira and Bambini Forever albums as well as the duo's 1988 single "Compañero" and a cover of Patrick Hernandez's song "Born to Be Alive".

"Ferragosto" was released in 1990, a dance single that would be reminiscent of some of the early singles, with new Italo house sounds that were popular for the music of the specific time period. In 1990, Righeira performed "Vamos a la playa" in the musical television program C'era una volta il festival, a competition between famous celebrities that were popular and had a successful musical career during the 1980s or earlier.

In 1992, the duo collaborated on the album Uno, Zero, Centomila, which contained songs such as "Vivo al 139" with inspiration from the house genre. Shortly after the album's release, Righi and Rota went their separate ways and the duo disbanded for the first time.

1992–1999: Hiatus and side projects 
In November 1993, Righi was arrested at a party hosted at his home in Padua, along with 38 others for possession and trafficking of drugs. He was imprisoned for five months until he was freed from the charges. Righi recalled: "The world collapsed on me ... my cellmates helped me a lot."

In the mid-1990s, Rota gave life to a new project called Gloria Mundi together with songwriters and musicians Franco Battiato and Giusto Pio, which would last until Righeira released their fourth studio album. At the same time, Righi recorded the song "Papalla" with the Italian duo Montefiori Cocktail, which became a manifesto for the newborn Italian lounge scene.

1999–2016: Reunion and second split 
In 1999, after a seven-year hiatus, the duo reunited and Righi and Rota began producing music together again.

The EP 2002 eight-track extended play (EP) was released in Italy in 2002.

On 2 February 2007, Mondovisione was released. Its accompanying single, "La musica electronica", was Righeira's last single to be released. In August 2007, Righeira participated in the launch of the radio program L'estate sta finendo on the R101 radio station. During the same period, Righi participated in various short films and experiments in metropolitan cinema, including the film Pink Forever, directed by Davide Scovazzo.

In 2008, the documentary film Tanzen mit Righeira was released. Directed by Alessandro Castelletto, it chronicled Righeira's career from the early 1980s to 2007, from their breakthrough in music to their final studio album release in 2007.

On 13 June 2011, the Italian rock Subsonica released the single "La funzione", in which Righeira was credited after collaborating with the band.

The duo's second separation came in 2016, seventeen years after the reunification, when Righi announced his separation, while Rota announced his plans on moving to the town of Thiene, located in the province of Vicenza in northern Italy.

2016–present: After the break-up

2010s 
Since their second separation in 2016, the relationship between Righi and Rota has deteriorated. When asked if Rota would turn up in an interview in August 2020, Righi answered, "I don't think he'll want to, but if he does, I won't send anyone away."

2020s 
In 2020, Righi founded his own record label, Kottolengo Recordings. Its headquarters are in Canavese, Italy.

Righi re-released "Vamos a la playa" in a brand new electro-kraut rock version remixed by musician and record producer Gaudi on 23 July 2021, marking the 40th anniversary of its release.

Musical style and development 
Righeira's music has mainly been described as Italo disco, new wave and synth-pop-influenced electronic music. The duo also experimented with various other genres throughout its career, including Eurodance, rock, reggae, and Italo house.

Influences 
Gipo Farassino and Filippo Tommaso Marinetti were some of the duo's earliest influences.

Contribution of La Bionda 
Interviewed by James Arena for the book Europe's Stars of '80s Dance Pop: 32 International Music Legends Discuss Their Careers, Carmelo La Bionda recalls on working with Righeira:

Legacy 
Righeira were well-liked by younger audiences for their flamboyant appearances, in addition to their singles; they used to wear fake mustaches in the likeness of Charlie Chaplin in the early stages of their careers.

Personnel 
Principal members

 Johnson Righeira – vocals, keyboards (1983–1992, 1999–2016)
 Michael Righeira – vocals, keyboards, harmonica (1983–1992, 1999–2016)

Discography 

 Righeira (1983)
 Bambini Forever (1986)
 Uno, Zero, Centomila (1992)
 Mondovisione (2007)

Selected filmography 
Documentaries and filmed performances
 Tanzen mit Righeira (2008)

References

Sources

External links 

 

 
1983 establishments in Italy
2016 disestablishments in Italy
Italo disco groups
Italian new wave musical groups
Italian pop music groups
Musical groups established in 1983
Musical groups disestablished in 2016
Musical groups from Turin
Italian musical duos
Spanish-language singers of Italy